was a Japanese era of the Northern Court during the Era of Northern and Southern Courts, lasting from August 1338 to  April 1342.

Nanboku-chō overview
   
During the Meiji period, an Imperial decree dated March 3, 1911 established that the legitimate reigning monarchs of this period were the direct descendants of Emperor Go-Daigo through Emperor Go-Murakami, whose  had been established in exile in Yoshino, near Nara.

Until the end of the Edo period, the militarily superior pretender-Emperors supported by the Ashikaga shogunate had been mistakenly incorporated in Imperial chronologies despite the undisputed fact that the Imperial Regalia were not in their possession.

This illegitimate  had been established in Kyoto by Ashikaga Takauji.

Change of era
 1338 :  The era name was changed to Ryakuō to mark an event or a number of events.  The previous era ended and a new one commenced in Kenmu 5.

Events of the Ryakuō Era
 1340 (Ryakuō 3): Observations of the "broom star" (comet) are recorded.

Southern Court Equivalents
Engen

Notes

References
 Nussbaum, Louis Frédéric and Käthe Roth. (2005). Japan Encyclopedia. Cambridge: Harvard University Press. ; OCLC 48943301
 Titsingh, Isaac. (1834). Nihon Ōdai Ichiran; ou,  Annales des empereurs du Japon.  Paris: Royal Asiatic Society, Oriental Translation Fund of Great Britain and Ireland. OCLC 5850691

External links
 National Diet Library, "The Japanese Calendar" – historical overview plus illustrative images from library's collection

Japanese eras
1330s in Japan
1340s in Japan